Vernon Bayley Wadsworth was a prominent surveyor in the province of Ontario. Wadsworth was born into a prominent family in Weston, Ontario, who owned mills on the Humber River.
Wadsworth was also a lawyer, and a director of the London and Canada Loan and Agency Company.

In 1868 Wadsworth entered into a partnership with Charles Unwin, another surveyor who had apprenticed under John Stoughton Dennis.
Both men had worked on the surveying of Muskoka County.

Wadsworth played a role in the management of both the Grand Trunk Railway and the Canadian Pacific Railway.

References

1842 births
1940 deaths
People from Weston, Toronto
Canadian surveyors